The following is a list of the major existing intergovernmental organizations (IGOs).

For a more complete listing, see the Yearbook of International Organizations, which includes 25,000 international non-governmental organizations (INGOs), excluding for-profit enterprises, about 5,000 IGOs, and lists dormant and dead organizations as well as those in operation (figures as of the 400th edition, 2012/13). A 2020 academic dataset on international organizations included 561 intergovernmental organizations between 1815 and 2015; more than one-third of those IGOs ended up defunct.

United Nations and agencies

The UN has six principal organs:
The General Assembly (the main deliberative assembly);
The Security Council (decides certain resolutions for peace and security);
The Economic and Social Council (assists in promoting international economic and social cooperation and development);
The Secretariat (provides studies, information, and facilities needed by the UN);
The International Court of Justice (the primary judicial organ).
The United Nations Trusteeship Council (inactive)

The UN also includes various Funds, Programmes and specialized agencies:
Food and Agriculture Organization
International Labour Organization
International Civil Aviation Organization
International Maritime Organization
International Telecommunication Union
Joint United Nations Programme on HIV/AIDS
United Nations Capital Development Fund
United Nations Human Rights Council (UNHRC)
United Nations International Children's Emergency Fund (UNICEF)
United Nations Development Programme
United Nations Educational, Scientific and Cultural Organization (UNESCO)
United Nations Environment Programme
United Nations Human Settlements Programme
United Nations Industrial Development Organization
United Nations Office for Disaster Risk Reduction (UNISDR)
United Nations Office on Drugs and Crime
Universal Postal Union
World Health Organization (WHO)
World Intellectual Property Organization
World Food Programme
World Meteorological Organization
World Tourism Organization
The UN maintains various offices:
United Nations Headquarters (New York City)
United Nations Office at Geneva
United Nations Office at Nairobi
United Nations Office at Vienna

The UN also includes subsidiary organs:
International Residual Mechanism for Criminal Tribunals
International Criminal Tribunal for the former Yugoslavia (ICTY)
International Criminal Tribunal for Rwanda (ICTR)

Agricultural research organizations

Africa Rice Center (West Africa Rice Development Association, WARDA)
Bioversity International (International Plant Genetics Resources Institute, IPGRI)
Center for International Forestry Research (CIFOR)
International Center for Tropical Agriculture (CIAT)
International Center for Agricultural Research in the Dry Areas (ICARDA)
International Crops Research Institute for the Semi-Arid Tropics (ICRISAT)
International Food Policy Research Institute (IFPRI)
International Institute of Tropical Agriculture (IITA)
International Livestock Research Institute (ILRI)
International Maize and Wheat Improvement Center (CIMMYT)
International Potato Center (CIP)
International Rice Research Institute (IRRI)
International Water Management Institute (IWMI)
World Agroforestry Centre (International Centre for Research in Agroforestry, ICRAF)
WorldFish Center (International Center for Living Aquatic Resources Management, ICLARM)
World Vegetable Center
CGIAR
CAB International (Centre for Agriculture and Bioscience International, CABI)

Fisheries organizations
Asia-Pacific Fishery Commission (APFIC)
Commission for the Conservation of Antarctic Marine Living Resources (CCAMLR)
Great Lakes Fishery Commission (GLFC)
Indian Ocean Tuna Commission (IOTC)
Inter-American Tropical Tuna Commission (IATTC)
International Commission for the Conservation of Atlantic Tunas (ICCAT) 
International Pacific Halibut Commission (IPHC)
International Whaling Commission (IWC) 
North-East Atlantic Fisheries Commission (NEAFC)
Northwest Atlantic Fisheries Organization (NAFO)
North Atlantic Salmon Conservation Organization (NASCO)
Pacific Salmon Commission (PSC)
Southeast Asian Fisheries Development Center (SEAFDEC)
Western and Central Pacific Fisheries Commission (WCPFC)

Maritime organizations

Antarctic Treaty Secretariat (ATS)
International Hydrographic Organization
International Maritime Organization
International Seabed Authority
International Council for the Exploration of the Sea (ICES)
Mediterranean Science Commission (CIESM)
North Pacific Marine Science Organization (PICES)

Financial, trade, and customs organizations

Alliance for Financial Inclusion (AFI)
African Development Bank
Asian Development Bank
Asian Infrastructure Investment Bank
Bank for International Settlements
Black Sea Trade and Development Bank (BSTDB)
Caribbean Development Bank (CDB)
Council of Europe Development Bank (CEB)
Eurasian Development Bank
European Bank for Reconstruction and Development (EBRD)
Federation of Euro-Asian Stock Exchanges
Financial Action Task Force (FATF)
Inter-American Development Bank
International Bureau of Weights and Measures (BIPM)
International Energy Agency (IEA)
International Fund for Agricultural Development (IFAD)
International Development Law Organization (IDLO), headquartered in Rome
International Monetary Fund (IMF)
Islamic Development Bank (IDB)
Netherlands Development Finance Company (FMO)
Nordic Development Fund (NDF)
Nordic Investment Bank (NIB)
New Development Bank (NDB)
Organization for Economic and Co-operation Development (OECD)
OPEC Fund for International Development (OPEC Fund)
Organization of Petroleum-Exporting Countries (OPEC)
West African Development Bank (BOAD)
World Bank Group
International Bank for Reconstruction and Development (IBRD)
International Development Association (IDA)
International Finance Corporation (IFC)
Multilateral Investment Guarantee Agency (MIGA)
International Centre for Settlement of Investment Disputes (ICSID)
World Customs Organization (WCO)
World Trade Organization (WTO)

Regional organizations

Europe
European Union (EU)
Western European Union (defunct)
Big Four (Western Europe)
Council of Europe (CoE)
Central European Initiative (CEI)
Energy Community
European Free Trade Association (EFTA)
European Organisation for the Exploitation of Meteorological Satellites (EUMETSAT)
European Patent Organisation (EPO)
European Political Community (EPC)
European Science Foundation
European Organisation for the Safety of Air Navigation (EUROCONTROL)
Group of 9 (G9)
International Commission on Civil Status (ICCS)
Central Commission for Navigation on the Rhine (CCNR)
Council of the Baltic Sea States (CBSS)
Assembly of European Regions (AER)
Eiroforum
European Organization for Nuclear Research (CERN)
European Fusion Development Agreement (EFDA JET)
European Molecular Biology Laboratory (EMBL)
European Space Agency (ESA)
European Southern Observatory (ESO)
European Synchrotron Radiation Facility (ESRF)
European x-ray free electron laser (European XFEL)
Institut Laue–Langevin (ILL)
Baltic Marine Environment Protection Commission
Benelux
Belgium–Luxembourg Economic Union
British–Irish Council
Nordic Council
Nordic Investment Bank
 Northern Dimension Partnership in Public Health and Social Well-being (NDPHS)
Organisation for Joint Armament Cooperation (OCCAR)
Agency for International Trade Information and Cooperation (AITIC)
Visegrád Group (V4)
EUREKA
European Cooperation in Science and Technology (COST)
 Community for Democracy and Rights of Nations (Commonwealth of Unrecognized States)
 European Centre for Medium-range Weather Forecasts (ECMWF)
West Nordic Council
Three Seas Initiative

Asia
Asia Cooperation Dialogue (ACD)
Asian Development Bank (ADB)
Asia-Pacific Economic Cooperation  (APEC)
East Asia Summit (EAS)
Association of Southeast Asian Nations (ASEAN)
Bay of Bengal Initiative for Multi-Sectoral Technical and Economic Cooperation (BIMSTEC)
International Network for Bamboo and Rattan (INBAR)
Mekong–Ganga Cooperation (MGC)
Mekong River Commission (MRC)
Partnerships in Environmental Management for the Seas of East Asia (PEMSEA)
South Asian Association for Regional Cooperation (SAARC)
Southeast Asian Ministers of Education Organization (SEAMEO)
Trilateral Cooperation Secretariat (TCS)
Gulf Cooperation Council (GCC)

Transcontinental
Group of Eight
Eurasia
Asia-Europe Foundation (ASEF)
Central Asian Cooperation Organization
Community for Democracy and Rights of Nations
Collective Security Treaty Organization (CSTO)
Conference on Interaction and Confidence Building Measures in Asia (CICA)
Commonwealth of Independent States (CIS)
Economic Cooperation Organization (ECO)
Eurasian Economic Union (EEU or EAEU)
GUAM Organization for Democracy and Economic Development
Organization of the Black Sea Economic Cooperation (BSEC)
Organization of Turkic States (OTS)
Shanghai Cooperation Organisation (SCO)
TRACECA
Union State
Trans-Atlantic
Group of Seven
Group of Ten (economics)
North Atlantic Treaty Organization (NATO)
Organization for Security and Co-operation in Europe (OSCE)
South Atlantic Peace and Cooperation Zone (ZPCAS)
Mediterranean
Union for the Mediterranean
Indian Ocean
Indian Ocean Rim Association for Regional Cooperation (IOR-ARC)
Indian Ocean Commission (COI)
Arctic Ocean
Arctic Council
Pacific Ocean:
ANZUS
Asia-Pacific Economic Cooperation (APEC)
Colombo Plan
Group of Five
Melanesian Spearhead Group (MSG)
Pacific Islands Forum
Pacific Regional Environment Programme (SPREP)
Secretariat of the Pacific Community
African, Caribbean and Pacific Group of States
Technical Centre for Agricultural and Rural Cooperation ACP-EU (CTA)
Afro-Asian organizations
Asian-African Legal Consultative Organization

Africa
African Organisation for Standardisation (ARSO)
African Union
Economic Community of Central African States (ECCAS)
Conseil de l'Entente
Economic Community of West African States (ECOWAS)
East African Community (EAC)
West African Economic and Monetary Union (UEMOA)
Southern African Development Community (SADC)
Intergovernmental Authority on Development (IGAD)
Arab Maghreb Union
International Conference on the Great Lakes Region (ICGLR)
African Ministers Council on Water(AMCOW)

Americas
Organization of American States (OAS)
Union of South American Nations (USAN)
Mercosur
Andean Community of Nations
Forum for the Progress and Integration of South America (PROSUR)
Caribbean Community (CARICOM)
Association of Caribbean States (ACS)
Organisation of Eastern Caribbean States (OECS)
Central American Parliament
Bolivarian Alliance for the Americas (ALBA)
Rio Group
System of Cooperation Among the American Air Forces (SICOFAA)
Central American Bank for Economic Integration (CABEI)
Central American Integration System
Community of Latin American and Caribbean States (CELAC)
Pacific Alliance

Military alliances

Australia, New Zealand, United States Security Treaty (ANZUS)
AUKUS 
Collective Security Treaty Organization (CSTO)
North Atlantic Treaty Organization (NATO)
Inter-American Treaty of Reciprocal Assistance (Rio Pact)

Cultural, ethnic, linguistic, and religious organizations
Commonwealth of Nations
International Centre for the Study of the Preservation and Restoration of Cultural Property (ICCROM)
Organisation internationale de la Francophonie
Community of Portuguese Language Countries (CPLP)
Organization of Ibero-American States (OEI)
Arab League
Organisation of Islamic Cooperation
International Organization of Turkic Culture (TÜRKSOY)
Interparliamentary Assembly on Orthodoxy

Educational organizations and universities
 Academy of European Law (ERA)
 Asian Institute of Technology (AIT)
 Cerlalc
 Commonwealth of Learning (COL)
 EUCLID (university)
 European Schools
 European University Institute
 International Bureau of Education IBE, now a part of UNESCO
 International Institute for the Unification of Private Law
 Model United Nations (MUN)
 United Nations University (UNU)
 World Maritime University (WMU/IMO)

Law enforcement cooperation

International Criminal Court (ICC)
International Criminal Police Organization (Interpol)
Permanent Court of Arbitration (PCA)

Transport

Intergovernmental Organisation for International Carriage by Rail (OTIF)
Organization for Cooperation of Railways (OSJD or OSShD)
International Civil Aviation Organization
TRACECA
Southeast Europe Transport Community
International Transport Forum (ITF)

Humanitarian organizations

International Cospas-Sarsat Programme

Environmental organizations

Agreement on the Conservation of Albatrosses and Petrels (ACAP)
The Forum of Ministers of Environment of Latin America and the Caribbean
Global Environment Facility (GEF)
Global Green Growth Institute (GGGI)
Intergovernmental Panel on Climate Change (IPCC)
The International Union for Conservation of Nature (IUCN)
Partnerships in Environmental Management for the Seas of East Asia (PEMSEA)
United Nations Environment Programme (UNEP)

Arms control 

Conference on Disarmament
Organisation for the Prohibition of Chemical Weapons (OPCW)
Preparatory Commission for the Comprehensive Nuclear-Test-Ban Treaty Organization (CTBTO)
Wassenaar Arrangement
Nuclear Suppliers Group (NSG)
Australia Group (AG)
Missile Technology Control Regime (MTCR)

Energy organizations

Multi sector organizations
International Energy Agency
Energy Charter
Energy Community
United Nations Industrial Development Organization (UNIDO)
International Institute for Applied Systems Analysis (IIASA)
International Energy Forum (IEF)

Nuclear power organizations

European Atomic Energy Community
International Atomic Energy Agency
International Centre for Synchrotron-Light for Experimental Science Applications in the Middle East
Korean Peninsula Energy Development Organization
Nuclear Energy Agency
United Nations Atomic Energy Commission
World Association of Nuclear Operators

Sustainable energy organizations
International Renewable Energy Agency  (IRENA) 
Sustainable Energy for All (SE4ALL)
Renewable Energy and Energy Efficiency Partnership (REEEP)
 International Solar Alliance

Digital organizations 
 Digital 9 (D9)

Ideological and political groupings
Quadrilateral Security Dialogue (QSD)
Non-Aligned Movement
Group of Seven (G7)
Group of 15 (G-15)
Group of 77 (G-77)
Group of 24 (G24)
G20
Alliance of Small Island States (AOSIS)
BRICS (Brazil, Russia, India, China, South Africa)
Bolivarian Alliance for the Americas  (ALBA)
Association of World Election Bodies (AWEB)
New Agenda Coalition
Non-Proliferation and Disarmament Initiative
Western European and Others Group

 (disbanded)

Other
Advisory Centre on World Trade Organization Law
International Centre for Genetic Engineering and Biotechnology
International Institute for Democracy and Electoral Assistance (International IDEA)
Partners in Population and Development
South Centre
World Organisation for Animal Health
Forum for India-Pacific Islands cooperation (FIPIC)
U-Report

Defunct
Allied Control Council
Arab Cooperation Council
Central Treaty Organization
Comecon
Council of Ambassadors
Customs and Economic Union of Central Africa
Delian League
Eurasian Economic Community (transformed into Eurasian Economic Union)
French Community
French Union
G33
International Authority for the Ruhr
International Trade Organization
Latin League
Latin Union
League of Corinth
League of Nations
Peloponnesian League
Organisation of African Unity
Southeast Asia Treaty Organization
Union of African States

See also
List of local government organizations

References 

Intergovernmental organizations, List of
International relations lists